|}

The Bengough Stakes is a Group 3 flat horse race in Great Britain open to horses aged three years or older. It is run at Ascot over a distance of 6 furlongs (1,207 metres), and it is scheduled to take place each year in early October.

History
The event was originally held at Newmarket, where it was called the Bentinck Stakes. It was named after Lord George Bentinck (1802–1848), a successful racehorse owner. It was established in 1986, and was initially a 5-furlong race with Listed status. It was extended to 6 furlongs in 1993, and promoted to Group 3 level in 2003.

The race was transferred to Ascot and renamed the Bengough Memorial Stakes in 2008. Its title was shortened to the Bengough Stakes in 2010. It was formerly staged in mid-October, but it is currently held in the early part of the month.

The Bengough Stakes is named in memory of Sir Piers Bengough (1929–2005), Her Majesty's Representative at Ascot from 1984 to 1997.

Records
Most successful horse (2 wins):
 Royal Rock – 2009, 2011

Leading jockey (3 wins):
 Ted Durcan – Royal Millennium (2004), Greek Renaissance (2007), Royal Rock (2011)

Leading trainer (3 wins):
 Saeed bin Suroor – Russian Revival (1996), Bygone Days (2006), Greek Renaissance (2007)
 Chris Wall – Ashdown Express (2003), Royal Rock (2009, 2011)

Winners

See also
 Horse racing in Great Britain
 List of British flat horse races
 Recurring sporting events established in 1986 – this race is included under its original title, Bentinck Stakes.

References
 Racing Post:

 galopp-sieger.de – Bengough Memorial Stakes.
 horseracingintfed.com – International Federation of Horseracing Authorities – Bengough Stakes (2018).
 pedigreequery.com – Bengough Memorial Stakes – Ascot.

Flat races in Great Britain
Ascot Racecourse
Open sprint category horse races